Juan Pilars (died 1521) was a Roman Catholic prelate who served as Archbishop of Cagliari (1514–1521) and Bishop of Sulcis (1503–1514).

Biography
On 7 July 1503, he was appointed during the papacy of Pope Alexander VI as Bishop of Sulcis in Sardinia. On 9 January 1514, he was appointed during the papacy of Pope Leo X as Archbishop of Cagliari in Sardinia. He served as until his death in 1521.  In the 16th century Sardinia belonged to Habsburg Spain. Presumably Juan Pilars descended from the Spanish Pilars family from Zaragoza. Another theory indicates that he was from Bohemia, also part of Habsburg Empire.

References

External links and additional sources
 (for Chronology of Bishops)
 (for Chronology of Bishops)

1521 deaths
Bishops appointed by Pope Alexander VI
Bishops appointed by Pope Leo X
16th-century Roman Catholic archbishops in Spain
Bishops in Sardinia
Barons Pilars de Pilar
Year of birth unknown